Super Solitaire is a Super Nintendo Entertainment System video game that has different variations version of the classic solitaire card game.

Summary
The variations of solitaire in the game include: Klondike, FreeCell, Golf, Cruel, Pyramid, Stonewall, Dozen't Matter, Aces Up, Florentine, Poker, Canfield and Scorpion. Classic artwork for each game's background is included along with optional graphics that look like something out of a cartoon. Soft music is included with each and every game variation.

Players can even choose to get hints or even skip to the next card through a special options screen.

Reception
On release, Famicom Tsūshin scored the game a 21 out of 40. GamePro praised the variety of games, the graphics, the music, and the ability to change the backgrounds, though they emphasized that the game would bore most children. Allgame would assign this video game a rating of 2.5 starts out of a possible 5.

References

1994 video games
Pack-In-Video games
Patience video games
Super Nintendo Entertainment System games
Super Nintendo Entertainment System-only games
Top-down video games
Video games developed in Australia
Single-player video games